Arbitrary arrest and arbitrary detention are the arrest or detention of an individual in a case in which there is no likelihood or evidence that they committed a crime against legal statute, or in which there has been no proper due process of law or order.

Background
Virtually all individuals who are arbitrarily arrested are given no explanation as to why they are being arrested, and they are not shown any arrest warrant. Depending on the social context, many or the vast majority of arbitrarily arrested individuals may be held incommunicado and their whereabouts can be concealed from their family, associates, the public population and open trial courts.

International law
Arbitrarily depriving an individual of their liberty is prohibited under international human rights law. Article 9 of the 1948 Universal Declaration of Human Rights decrees that "no one shall be subjected to arbitrary arrest, detention or exile"; that is, no individual, regardless of circumstances, is to be deprived of their liberty or exiled from their country without having first committed an actual criminal offense against a legal statute, and the government cannot deprive an individual of their liberty without proper due process of law. As well, the International Covenant on Civil and Political Rights specifies the protection from arbitrary arrest and detention by the Article 9. The implementation of the Covenants is monitored by the United Nations human rights treaty bodies.

See also
 Administrative detention
 Contempt of cop
 False arrest
 False imprisonment
 Forced disappearance
 Habeas corpus
 Kettling
 Kidnapping
 Mass arrest
 Preemptive arrest
 Preventive detention
 Retaliatory arrest and prosecution
 Secret police
 Working Group on Arbitrary Detention

References

External links
Behind the Wire: An Update to Ending Secret Detentions (2005), Human Rights First

Imprisonment and detention
Counterterrorism
Emergency laws
Human rights abuses
Kidnapping
Political repression
Law enforcement
Enforced disappearance
Police misconduct